The Captive Heart is a 1946 British war drama, directed by Basil Dearden and starring Michael Redgrave. It is about a Czechoslovak Army officer who is captured in the Fall of France and spends five years as a prisoner of war, during which time he forms a long-distance relationship with the widow of a British Army officer. The film was entered into the 1946 Cannes Film Festival.

The film is partly based on the true story of a Czechoslovak officer in the RAF Volunteer Reserve, Josef Bryks MBE, and his relationship with a British WAAF, Gertrude Dellar, who was the widow of an RAF pilot.

Plot
In the summer of 1940, Captain Karel Hašek of the Czechoslovak Army escapes from Dachau concentration camp and assumes the identity of a dead British officer, Captain Geoffrey Mitchell. When he is caught, he joins thousands of British prisoners of war, captured during the Battle of France, on a march to a prison camp in western Germany.

He is suspected of being a spy by his fellow soldiers because of a few small errors and his fluency in the German language. Captain Grayson wants to lynch him forthwith, but Major Dalrymple, the senior British officer, hears Hašek out and believes his story.

To avoid suspicion, he has to maintain the fiction that Mitchell is still alive by corresponding with Mitchell's widow Celia. Prior to the war, Mitchell had abandoned his wife and their two children, but the letters rekindle Celia's love.

In 1944, Herr Forster, who ran Dachau during Hašek's stay, visits the camp. Hašek fears he may be unmasked. The official compliments him on his nearly perfect German and seems to recognise him, but cannot quite place him. On another visit, Forster orders a search that uncovers the prisoners' escape tunnel. Forster then orders that a moat be built around the camp, and the inmates resign themselves to a long stay. On a third visit, Forster tells Hašek that he knows he is not Mitchell and that his photograph has been sent to Berlin for identification. Soon after, it is announced that some prisoners are to be repatriated, but when Hašek goes for his medical examination to see if he qualifies, he is turned away.

A plan to save him is devised without his knowledge. Private Mathews, a burglar in civilian life, breaks into the kommandant's office late at night with Dalrymple and another man. They find the list of those to be repatriated and replace Mathews' name with Mitchell's. On the way back to the barracks, Mathews is attacked by a guard dog and rescued by Hašek. The plan works, and Hašek is "returned" to Britain.

He goes to see Celia. He breaks the news of her husband's death and that he has grown to love her. She is devastated, and Hašek leaves. After she recovers, she begins rereading his letters and realises that she has come to love the writer. When Hašek calls her on the telephone on the day that Germany surrenders, she is eager to speak with him.

Main cast

Michael Redgrave as Capt. Karel Hašek [alias Geoffrey Mitchell]
Rachel Kempson as Celia Mitchell
Frederick Leister as Mr. Mowbray
Mervyn Johns as Pte. Evans
Rachel Thomas as Dilys Evans [Dai Evan's wife, who dies giving birth to their child during his absence]
Jack Warner as Cpl. Horsfall [Dai's friend and business partner in civilian life]
Gladys Henson as Flo Horsfall [Ted's wife]
James Harcourt as Doctor
Gordon Jackson as Lieut. David Lennox [who breaks off his engagement with Elspeth McDougall after he learns his blindness is permanent]
Elliott Mason as Mrs. Lennox (as Elliot Mason)
Margot Fitzsimons as Elspeth McDougall [who refuses to give David up]
David Keir as Mr. McDougall
Derek Bond as Lieut. Harley [in love with his wife Caroline, but believes a poison pen letter sent to him by Beryl Curtiss]
Jane Barrett as Caroline Harley
Meriel Forbes as Beryl Curtiss [jealous of Caroline because of Robert Marsden's love of her]
Basil Radford as Major Ossy Dalrymple
Guy Middleton as Capt. Jim Grayson
Jimmy Hanley as Pte. Mathews
Robert Wyndham as Lieut. Cdr. Robert Marsden RNVR
Jack Lambert as Padre
Karel Stepanek as Herr Forster
Friedrich Richter as Camp Commandant (as Frederick Richter)
Frederick Schiller as German M.O. [medical officer]
Jill Gibbs as Janet Mitchell
David Walbridge as Desmond Mitchell

Many of the prisoners were played by serving soldiers.

Production
Locations included the ex-naval prisoner of war camp Marlag, near Westertimke, which had remained largely intact after the end of the war the previous year, and Aston Rowant railway station.

Reception
According to trade papers, the film was a "notable box office attraction" at the British box office in 1946. Another source says it was the fourth biggest hit at the British box office in 1946 after The Wicked Lady, The Bells of St Marys and Piccadilly Incident. According to Kinematograph Weekly the 'biggest winner' at the box office in 1946 Britain was The Wicked Lady, with "runners up" being The Bells of St Marys, Piccadilly Incident, The Road to Utopia, Tomorrow is Forever, Brief Encounter, Wonder Man, Anchors Away, Kitty, The Captive Heart, The Corn is Green, Spanish Main, Leave Her to Heaven, Gilda, Caravan, Mildred Pierce, Blue Dahlia, Years Between, O.S.S., Spellbound, Courage of Lassie, My Reputation, London Town, Caesar and Cleopatra, Meet the Navy, Men of Two Worlds, Theirs is the Glory, The Overlanders, and Bedelia.

References

External links

Review of film at Variety

1940s war drama films
1946 films
British black-and-white films
British war drama films
Ealing Studios films
Films directed by Basil Dearden
Films produced by Michael Balcon
World War II prisoner of war films
Films set in 1940
Films set in 1944
Films set in Germany
Films shot in Germany
1946 drama films
Films with screenplays by Patrick Kirwan
1940s English-language films
1940s British films